Chamber Music Northwest (CMNW) is an American non-profit organization in Portland, Oregon that is dedicated to the performance and promotion of chamber music. The organization's main presentation is its annual five-week Summer Festival, that occurs during the months of June and July. Performances are held at the Kaul Auditorium on the campus of Reed College and in Lincoln Hall at Portland State University, as well as other venues. The organization also presents individual chamber music concerts throughout the year, as well as educational and community engagement programs.

Chamber Music Northwest is a frequent commissioner of new music, premiering several new works by leading and emerging composers each year. A number of its commissions are available on recordings released by the Delos record label, including Spring Forward (2019) featuring new works by Peter Schickele, Richard Danielpour, and Aaron Jay Kernis, and Clarinet Quartets for Our Time (2019), featuring new works by Valerie Coleman, Chris Rogerson, and David Schiff. The organization regularly features many of the world's greatest chamber music performers and its performances are featured on NPR's Performance Today.  CMNW was founded in 1971 by violinist Sergiu Luca. Since 1981, its artistic director has been clarinetist David Shifrin. Shifrin will step down after the 2020 Summer Festival, passing the artistic director baton to husband and wife team Gloria Chien (piano) and Soovin Kim (violin), who are also the co-artistic directors of the Lake Champlain Chamber Music Festival.

External links
Official Website of Chamber Music Northwest

References

1970 establishments in Oregon
Chamber music groups
Classical music festivals in the United States
Music of Portland, Oregon
Arts organizations established in 1970